Burleigh Hines (August 26, 1935 - November 8, 2009) was an American television news reporter.

A native of Nashville, Tennessee, Hines began his career as a newspaper reporter.  He wrote for the Memphis Tri-State Defender and the Chicago Daily News throughout the 1960s.

From 1968 until 1974, Hines was a correspondent for WBBM in Chicago. In 1974, he joined WBBM-TV as the station's editorial director. He transitioned to being an on-air reporter for the TV station, a position he held until retiring in 2001. He covered many types of stories including; crime, human interest stories, and animal stories. His great love was working on the streets, reporting on ordinary people doing remarkable things.

In 1968, Hines co-authored the book Nightmare in Detroit: A Rebellion and its Victims, with Van Gordon Sauter, who went on to become president of CBS News. The book is about Detroit riots in July, 1967.

Personal 
He is survived by his wife, Denise, his six children, and many grandchildren.

References 

American television reporters and correspondents
People from Nashville, Tennessee
People from Chicago
1932 births
2009 deaths
American male journalists
Journalists from Illinois
20th-century American journalists